Sympistis ragani is a moth of the family Noctuidae first described by William Barnes in 1928. It is endemic to the Klamath Mountains of northwestern California and southwestern Oregon, and the Oregon Coast Range.

It is the largest of six similar gray Pacific Northwest species in the Sympistis atricollaris species group that have a black H-shaped pattern of antemedial and postmedial lines that are connected by a line across the median area. The moth's wingspan is 30–35 mm.

External links

 "Sympistis ragani (Barnes, 1928)". Pacific Northwest Moths. Includes a distribution map.

ragani
Moths of North America
Biota of Oregon
Fauna of California
Endemic fauna of the United States
Natural history of the California Coast Ranges
~
~
Moths described in 1928